PCMB may refer to:

 p-Chloromercuribenzoic acid
 Plymouth-Canton Marching Band
 PCMB (encoding), a mixed multi-byte character set 
 Physics chemistry maths and biology together